is a railway station in Gose, Nara Prefecture, Japan. This station has a transfer to JR Gose Station on the Wakayama Line.

Line
Kintetsu Gose Line

Layout
The station has 2 side platforms serving a track each, with a train crossing in the south of the platforms  in case a train cannot stop at the stop position.

Surroundings
Gose Police Building (former Gose Police Station)
Gose Post Office
Gose City Hall
Saiseikai Gose Hospital
Supermarket Life
Nara Prefectural Seisho High School

Buses
Buses are operated by Nara Kotsu Bus Lines Co., Ltd. (Nara Kotsu website)

Bus stop 1
limited express buses for Shingu Station via Kamokimi no Yu, Gojo Bus Station, Totsukawa Onsen, Hongu Taisha, Yunomine Onsen and Kawayu Onsen
for Gojo Bus Station
for Gojo Bus Station via Kamokimi no Yu
for Gojo Bus Station via Techno Chuo-dori higashi
Bus stop 2
expressway bus "Yamato" for Shinjuku (Expressway Bus Terminal) - operation with Kanto Bus Co., Ltd.
for  via Takadashi Station, AEON Mall Kashihara-kita and Idai-byoin-mae (Nara Medical University Hospital)
for  via Takadashi Station
for Oshimi
Bus stop 3
for Katsuragi Ropeway-mae
Bus stop 4
for Yagi Station via Gunkaibashi, Kashiharajingu-mae Station, Ousa and Idai-byoin Genkanguchi (Nara Medical University Hospital)

Adjacent stations

|-
!colspan=5|Kintetsu Railway

Railway stations in Japan opened in 1930
Railway stations in Nara Prefecture